Radha Saluja is an Indian actress who has worked mainly in Hindi cinema, Punjabi cinema and Tamil, with a few Bengali, Malayalam, Telugu and Kannada movies.  An alumna of the Film and Television Institute of India, she is known for her films opposite M. G. Ramachandran like Indru Pol Endrum Vaazhga and Idhayakkani, both of which were blockbusters in Tamil in 1977 and 1975 respectively. She is known for her Hindi films like Haar Jeet (1972) and Ek Mutthi Aasmaan (1973). In 1975, she appeared in the breakthrough Punjabi film Morni (1975).

Career
In the early 1970s, she appeared as a female lead in numerous films, like Aaj Ki Taaza Khabar (1973), Man Jeete Jag Jeet (1973), Dukh Bhanjan Tera Naam (1974), Man Jeete Jag Jeet, a Sikh religious film in Punjabi, wherein she was cast alongside Sunil Dutt. She also appeared alongside M. G. Ramachandran in the Tamil films, Idhayakkani (1975) and Indru Pol Endrum Vaazhga (1977), both of which became blockbusters of the year 1975 and 1977, in the Tamil film industry. She acted with N. T. Rama Rao and Rajinikanth in the Telugu film, Tiger (1979).

In 1981, she appeared in Sazaye Maut by Vidhu Vinod Chopra, to whom her sister Renu was married. This was the full-length remake of Chopra's own diploma film at FTII, Pune, Murder at Monkey Hill (1976). She played the role Anjali Paigankar had in the original film.

Personal life
Radha Saluja is the elder sister of well-known film editor Renu Saluja.

After a stint in films she moved to Los Angeles, where she married Shamim Zaidi, host of an ethnic radio programme. There she sang with two music groups that performed across the US. While living in United States, she took on a job with federal law services working as special interpreter of Asian languages at a Los Angeles court.

Filmography

Hindi

Punjabi

Tamil

Bengali

Telugu

Kannada

Malayalam

References

External links
 
 Radha Saluja at Bollywood Hungama

Actresses in Hindi cinema
Actresses in Tamil cinema
American people of Punjabi descent
Indian film actresses
Indian emigrants to the United States
Actresses in Punjabi cinema
Film and Television Institute of India alumni
Living people
American actresses of Indian descent
20th-century Indian actresses
Actresses in Telugu cinema
Actresses in Malayalam cinema
Year of birth missing (living people)
Actresses in Bengali cinema
Actresses in Kannada cinema
21st-century American women